Ivan Frederick Boesky (born March 6, 1937) is a former American stock trader who became infamous for his prominent role in an insider trading scandal that occurred in the United States during the mid-1980s. He was charged and pled guilty to insider trading, was fined a record $100 million, served three years in prison and became an informant.

Early life and education
Boesky was born to a Jewish family in Detroit, Michigan. His family owned several delicatessens and taverns in the city. He attended the Cranbrook School in Bloomfield Hills before graduating from Detroit's Mumford High School. He then attended courses at Wayne State University, Eastern Michigan University and the University of Michigan. Despite lacking an undergraduate degree, he was admitted to Detroit College of Law (now Michigan State University College of Law) and graduated during 1965. In the 1980s, he served as an adjunct professor at Columbia University's Graduate School of Business and at New York University's Graduate School of Business.

During 1962, he married Seema Silberstein, the daughter of a Detroit real estate magnate whose holdings included The Beverly Hills Hotel in California. After his father-in-law’s death, Boesky and Seema won a court battle with her sister and brother-in-law over the hotel’s ownership.

Career
In 1966, Boesky and his wife relocated to New York where he worked for several stock brokerage companies, including L.F. Rothschild and Edwards & Hanly. In 1975, he initiated his own stock brokerage company, Ivan F. Boesky & Company, with $700,000 (equivalent to $ million in ) worth of start-up money from his wife’s family with a business plan that speculated on corporate takeovers. Boesky's company grew from profits as well as buy-in investments from new partnerships. By 1986, Boesky had become an arbitrageur who had amassed a fortune of more than US$200 million by betting on corporate takeovers and the $136 million in proceeds from the sale of The Beverly Hills Hotel. Boesky was on the cover of Time magazine December 1, 1986.

In 1986, Boesky entered into a plea agreement with the United States Attorneys Office for the Southern District of New York, agreeing to plead guilty to one count of Conspiracy to Commit Violations of the Federal Securities Laws.   Boesky used inside information provided by Robert Wilkis and Ira Sokolow, two investment bankers, and purchased securities for entities Boesky was affiliated with. The inside information typically involved tender offers, mergers or other possible business combinations, for companies such as Nabisco Brands, Inc., R.J. Reynolds, and Houston Natural Gas Corp.

Although insider trading of this kind was illegal, laws prohibiting it were rarely enforced until Boesky was prosecuted. Boesky cooperated with the SEC and informed on others, including the case against financier Michael Milken. As a result of a plea bargain, Boesky received a prison sentence of  years and was fined US$100 million. Although he was released after two years, he was permanently prohibited from working with securities. He served his sentence at Lompoc Federal Prison Camp near Vandenberg Air Force Base in California.

Boesky, unable to rehabilitate his reputation after being released from prison, paid hundreds of millions of dollars as fines and compensation for his Guinness share-trading fraud role and a number of separate insider-dealing scams. Later, Boesky began practicing Judaism and attended classes at the Jewish Theological Seminary of America where he had been a major donor; however, during 1987, after the fallout from his financial scandal, The New York Times reported that "after Ivan F. Boesky had been fined $100 million in the insider-trading scandal, the Jewish Theological Seminary, acting at his request, took his name off its $20 million library."

Personal life
In 1991, he divorced his wife and she agreed to pay him $23 million and $180,000 a year for life. They have four children. His daughter Marianne is an art dealer. His second wife is Ana Boesky and they have a child. They live in La Jolla, California.  Stuart J. Boesky is his first cousin.

In popular culture
The character of Gordon Gekko in the movie Wall Street (1987) is based at least in part on Boesky, especially regarding a famous speech he delivered in May 1986 on the positive aspects of greed during a commencement ceremony at the Haas School of Business of UC Berkeley, where he said in part "I think greed is healthy. You can be greedy and still feel good about yourself".

Boesky has been featured in a CNBC documentary entitled the Empires of New York.

The conviction of Boesky is referenced at various points in the television film Barbarians at the Gate (1993).

He is referenced by The 80s Guy in the "Future Stock" episode of Futurama.

In the season 2, episode 3 of the USA Network series Psych entitled Psy Vs Psy, Boesky is referenced as being personally arrested by the major character of the episode, Special Agent Lars Ewing of the Federal Treasury Department.

In Season 2, Episode 18 of the series Gilmore Girls titled "Back in the Saddle Again", Rory's classmate says "I feel like Ivan Boesky" when Chip sees what Richard and Paris have set up for the economics class business fair group project meeting.

In season 1, episode 20 of Robocop: The Series, the Chairman of OCP states he attended Ivan Boesky Elementary Business School.

References

External links 
 Taking America: How We Got from the First Hostile Takeover to Megamergers, Corporate Raiding, and Scandal, by Jeff Madrick, Beard Books, 2003. Retrieved March 10, 2019. 
 

1937 births
1986 crimes in the United States
American businesspeople convicted of crimes
American financial businesspeople
American hoteliers
20th-century American Jews
American people convicted of fraud
American white-collar criminals
Businesspeople from Detroit
Corporate raiders
Cranbrook Educational Community alumni
Detroit College of Law alumni
Living people
People convicted of insider trading
Stock and commodity market managers
Mumford High School alumni
Columbia Business School faculty
New York University faculty
21st-century American Jews